Bespalov (masculine) or Bespalova (feminine) is a Russian surname. Notable people with the surname include:

Anastasiya Bespalova, Russian composer
Irina Bespalova (born 1981), Russian swimmer
Mariya Bespalova (born 1986), Russian hammer thrower
Nikita Bespalov (born 1987), Russian ice hockey player

Russian-language surnames